Horndeski's theory is the most general theory of gravity in four dimensions whose Lagrangian is constructed out of the metric tensor and a scalar field and leads to second order equations of motion. The theory was first proposed by Gregory Horndeski in 1974 and has found numerous applications, particularly in the construction of cosmological models of Inflation and dark energy. Horndeski's theory contains many theories of gravity, including General relativity, Brans-Dicke theory, Quintessence, Dilaton, Chameleon and covariant Galileon as special cases.

Action
Horndeski's theory can be written in terms of an action as

with the Lagrangian densities

Constraints on parameters

See also 
 Classical theories of gravitation
 General relativity
 Brans–Dicke theory
Dual graviton
Massive gravity
Alternatives to general relativity

References 

General relativity